The African forest turtle (Pelusios gabonensis) is a species of turtle in the family Pelomedusidae. It is endemic to Africa, where it can be found in Angola, Burundi, Cameroon, Equatorial Guinea, Gabon,  the Democratic Republic of the Congo, the Republic of the Congo, Ghana, Tanzania, and Uganda

Description
The African forest turtle is a side-necked turtle; unable to fully withdraw their heads into their shells, they draw them to the side and fold them beneath the upper edge of their shells.

This species is characterized by a flattened, brown carapace with a black dorsal line. The plastron hinge is located in rear position.

References

Bibliography

African forest turtle
Reptiles of Central Africa
Reptiles of Angola
Vertebrates of Burundi
Reptiles of Nigeria
Reptiles of Tanzania
Reptiles of Uganda
African forest turtle
Taxa named by Gabriel Bibron
Taxa named by André Marie Constant Duméril